Barang-e Bozorg (also known as Barang, Barmak-e Bozorg, and Bernag-e Bozorg) is a village in Vahdatiyeh Rural District, Sadabad District, Dashtestan County, Bushehr Province, Iran. At the 2006 census, its population was 78, in 13 families.

References 

Populated places in Dashtestan County